"Il mediatore" (The Broker) is one of  Alberto Moravia's sixty-one Racconti romani.

Cast of characters
There are five characters in the story, "Il mediatore", listed by order of appearance:
 The narrator, Proietti
 Antonio, il maggiordomo (the princess's butler)
 La principessa (the princess)
 Signor Casiraghi, a potential buyer of the princess's apartment
 Signor Pandolfi, another potential buyer

Synopsis
The story begins with the narrator, Proietti (a real estate broker) and Antonio, a butler who works for the princess.  Proietti, the narrator, is a real estate agent who has been hired by the princess to sell her apartment. Antonio greets Proietti at the start of the story as he arrives and warns him that the princess has become greedy and money hungry since the death of her husband. At first, she is thought to be old, but Antonio points out that she is a mere 25 years old with a passion for business affairs, taking charge of financial situations wanting to let no one profit at her expense. Antonio warns him that he is unlikely to earn much because of her greed to which he responds that he is a mediator, has been hired to do a job, and will do, take his cut and go. But Antonio seems to know the outcome of the situation before it even starts, warning Proietti that while the princess is beautiful beyond words, he will be 'spitting blood' in the end.

The narrator meets the princess who immediately captivates him not only by her beauty but also her desire for money and her greed. Proietti performs an inspection of the apartment quotes a price for the princess, who immediately refutes his expertise and insists on a higher price for the aging property, which requires a lot of work, necessitating a lower price than what the princess expects. Proietti does his best to counsel the princess in real estate matters, but her obstinacy and greeds win out.  Two men of means come to see the apartment - first, a man from Milan, Signor Casarighi. After initially accepting Signor Casarighi's offer, she rebuffs him the next day.  He promptly leaves, refusing to pay more for the property which requires so much additional work. 

The princess continues to drive up the price of the apartment slowly: noting the excellent views from the apartment, its prime location and its future worth.  A second man, Signor Pandolfi, arrives to view the apartment and shows an instant infatuation with the princess. She works her charms on the second buyer - having foretold to Proietti that a woman can make a man do anything if she so chooses. The princess immediately uses her feminine guile to her advantage which disgusts Proietti. Throughout the story, Moravia describes for the reader the way in which the princess is constantly calling the married Proietti at all hours of the day - as if they were having an illicit affair. He displays angst and frustration at the fact that their relationship never ventures beyond business, to which he replies that she has a piggy bank instead of a heart.  Proietti himself is falling for the princess's charms.  

As the story ends, Proietti's patience runs thin, as the butler foretold.  His disgust of the princess's feigned attraction to the new buyer, Signor Pandolfi, and her desire to sell the property at far more than it is worth finally reaches its limits, and the jealous Proietti explodes.    Proietti becomes upset with the princess, shouting that he is a broker, not a pimp and storms off, leaving her to deal with the sale of her apartment on her own. Many months later, Proietti runs into Antonio, the princess's butler, who tells him that the princess has since married. Angry, jealous and still very much infatuated with the princess, he assumes that she has married the unattractive (yet very rich) Pandolfi, but Antonio corrects him, telling the narrator that she has married an extremely old man—old enough to be her grandfather, but also very rich.

As the story ends, Proietti asks Antonio if she is still so stunningly beautiful, to which he replies ironically: "An angel."

Footnotes

Racconti Romani